The Beholla pistol was developed by Becker & Hollander. During World War I, it was a secondary military pistol used by the Imperial German Army. It was manufactured from 1915 until 1918, where, at that point, about 45,000 were produced.

After the Great War, the firm of Waffenfabrik August Menz of Suhl continued to produce the Beholla as the Menta.

Users
 
  - Approximately 1,353 obtained circa 1919–1920
 
 
 
 
 
 
 
 
  
Railway guards during World War II

References

External links
 

1915 establishments in Germany
1918 disestablishments in Germany
Semi-automatic pistols of Germany
World War I German infantry weapons
.32 ACP semi-automatic pistols